This is a list of flag bearers who have represented Estonia at the Olympics.

Opening ceremony
Flag bearers carry the national flag of their country at the opening ceremony of the Olympic Games.

See also
Estonia at the Olympics

References

Estonia at the Olympics
Olympics
Estonia